Apsara Chapagai Khatri (born 1971)  is a Nepali politician. In January 2023, he became Deputy Speaker of Bagmati Provincial Assembly. He is a member of the Bagmati Provincial Assembly, having been elected as a proportional representative from the Khas people category in the 2022 Provincial Assembly election.

References

Nepalese politicians
1971 births
Living people